Rangam-peta is a village and a Mandal in East Godavari district in the state of Andhra Pradesh in India.

References 

Villages in East Godavari district